The team eventing event, part of the equestrian program at the 1996 Summer Olympics was held from 21 to 24 July 1996. The competition was held in the Georgia International Horse Park, in Conyers, Georgia. The team event was a separate event from the individual eventing. A rider could compete in both competitions (on different horses). Like all other equestrian events, the eventing competition was mixed gender, with both male and female athletes competing in the same division. 16 teams, each consisting of between three and four horse and rider pairs, entered the contest.

Medalists

Results

Dressage

Each team consisted of four pairs of horse and rider.  The penalty points of the lowest three pairs were added together to reach the team's penalty points.

Cross Country

Each team consisted of four pairs of horse and rider.  The penalty points of the lowest three pairs were added together to reach the team's penalty points.

Dressage & Cross Country
Each team consisted of four pairs of horse and rider.  The penalty points of the lowest three pairs were added together to reach the team's penalty points.

Jumping

Each team consisted of four pairs of horse and rider.  The penalty points of the lowest three pairs were added together to reach the team's penalty points.

Dressage, Cross Country, & Jumping (Final Result)
Each team consisted of four pairs of horse and rider.  The penalty points of the lowest three pairs were added together to reach the team's penalty points.

References

Sources
 Official Report of the 1996 Summer Olympics available at  https://web.archive.org/web/20060622162855/http://www.la84foundation.org/5va/reports_frmst.htm

Team